The 2018 Chicago Fire season is the club's 23rd year of existence, as well as their 21st in Major League Soccer.

Current squad 
As of August 10, 2018. Source: Chicago Fire official roster and Official MLS Roster

Player movement

In

Out

Loaned in

Loaned out

Unsigned trialists and draft picks
Pre-Season
 Midfielder  Omar Castro
 Midfielder/Forward  Joshua Gatt, last played for Colorado Rapids; left the team on February 26
 Goalkeeper  Sam Howard, last played for IFK Åmål in Sweden; left the team on February 19
 Defender  Maxi Moreira, last played for Huracán F.C. in Uruguay
 Defender  Josh Morton from California, picked 84th overall in the SuperDraft; was not part of the starting camp roster
 Forward  Albert Ruiz, last played for Florida Gulf Coast Eagles after not being selected in the SuperDraft; left camp sometime after the game against Kansas City

Academy midfielders Gilberto Angeles and Javier Casas also trained with the Fire while they were in Florida. Academy goalie Kyle Orciuch trained once they got back to Chicago after their travel to Bradenton as well.

Technical staff

Standings

Eastern Conference table

Overall table

Results summary

Match results

Preseason 
Kickoff times are in CST (UTC−06)

Major League Soccer 
Kickoff times are in CST (UTC−06)

Open Cup 
Kickoff times are in CST (UTC−06)

International Friendlies 
Kickoff times are in CST (UTC−06)

Squad statistics

Games Played

Goalkeeping Statistics

Goalscoring and Assisting Record

Cards

Notes 
Player left during the season
</onlyinclude>

Awards

MLS Team of the Week

MLS Goal of the week

Tulsa Loanee Statistics 
The Fire renewed their affiliation with Tulsa for another season on January 12, 2018. The affiliation allows for players to be called back at any point or loaned out at any point.

Loaned Out 
The following players were loaned out during the season:

Games Played

Goalscoring and Assisting Record

Cards

Goalkeeping Statistics

Notes 
Player left during the season

National team call-ups 
Yura Movsisyan
UEFA Nations League Match vs Gibraltar, October 13 (Started, played 69 minutes)
UEFA Nations League Match vs Macedonia, October 16 (Started, played 74 minutes, scored one goal)

Nemanja Nikolić
Friendly vs Luxembourg, November 9, 2017 (Started, played 75 minutes, scored one goal)
Friendly vs Costa Rica, November 14, 2017 (Started, played 81 minutes, scored one goal)
Friendly vs Kazakhstan, March 23 (Started, played 76 minutes)
Friendly vs Scotland, March 27 (Subbed on, played 7 minutes)

Nicolas Hasler
UEFA Nations League Match vs Armenia, September 6 (Started, played 90 minutes, assisted one goal)
UEFA Nations League Match vs Gibraltar, September 9 (Started, played 90 minutes)
UEFA Nations League Match vs Macedonia, October 13 (Started, played 90 minutes)
UEFA Nations League Match vs Gibraltar, October 16 (Started, played 90 minutes)

Matt Polster
Friendly vs Bosnia and Herzegovina, January 28 (Started, played 90 minutes)
Brandon Vincent
Friendly vs Bosnia and Herzegovina, January 28 (Did not play)

References

External links 
 

Chicago Fire FC seasons
Chicago Fire Soccer Club
Chicago Fire Soccer Club
Chicago Fire